Webster Lake is a lake in Berrien County, in the U.S. state of Michigan.

Webster Lake has the name of Luke Webster, a pioneer settler.

References

Lakes of Berrien County, Michigan